Potrero del Llano may refer to:

SS Potrero del Llano, oil tanker built in 1912
Potrero del Llano, Chihuahua, rural community in Chihuahua